The dominant religion in Vojvodina is Orthodox Christianity, mainly represented by the Serbian Orthodox Church, while other important religions of the region are Catholic Christianity, Protestant Christianity, Islam, and Judaism.

Demographics

Christianity

Orthodox Christianity

The absolute majority of the population of Vojvodina (77.2%) are adherents of Orthodox Christianity. Most of the adherents belong to the Serbian Orthodox Church, and smaller number of them to the Romanian Orthodox Church. The ethnic groups whose members are mostly adherents of Orthodox Christianity are: Serbs, Montenegrins, Romanians and Vlachs, Yugoslavs, Romani, Macedonians, Ukrainians, Russians, Greeks, etc.

The Fruška Gora, a mountain in Vojvodina, is considered by some as one of the three Holy Mountains of the Orthodox Christianity (The other two being Athos and  Sinai). There are as many as sixteen Orthodox monasteries located on the Fruška Gora. During the Ottoman rule in the 16th and 17th centuries, the number of Orthodox monasteries on the Fruška Gora was as high as 35. There are also two Orthodox monasteries in the part of Syrmia that belong to Belgrade (but which historically belonged to Vojvodina), three Orthodox monasteries in the Bačka, and seven in the Banat.

The roots of Christianity in this region date back to the 3rd century when the Episcopate of Syrmia was established. This Episcopate existed until 1183, when the region of Syrmia was included in the Catholic Kingdom of Hungary. The 11th century Bulgaro-Slavic rulers of the territory of the present-day Vojvodina region, Ahtum and Sermon, were Orthodox Christians.

The Orthodox population which lived in the region was an impediment to the establishment of Catholic Church organization in the Medieval Kingdom of Hungary. The Catholic inquisitor, Jacob de Marki, tried in 1483 to forcibly convert Orthodox Christians in the region to Catholicism.

With the Ottoman conquest of the region in the 16th century, the Catholic population mostly fled, and during Ottoman rule, the population of the region was mostly composed of Orthodox Christians, with some Muslims living in the cities.

At the end of the 17th century, the Muslim Ottoman Empire was replaced with the Catholic Habsburg monarchy, and during the Habsburg rule many Catholic settlers came to the region. Catholics then became the majority in the northern parts of the region, while Orthodox Christians remained the majority in the southern parts.

Catholicism

Catholic Christians constitute  17.4% of the population of Vojvodina. The ethnic groups whose members are mostly adherents of the Catholic Church are: Hungarians, Croats, Bunjevci, Germans, Slovenes, Czechs, Šokci, Poles, Banat Bulgarians, etc. A smaller percentage of Romani, Yugoslavs, and Slovaks are also adherents of Catholicism. The ethnic Rusyns and a smaller part of the ethnic Ukrainians are adherents of the Eastern Catholic (Uniate) Greek Catholic Church of Croatia and Serbia, of which the Greek Catholic Eparchy of Ruski Krstur is based in Ruski Krstur in Vojvodina.

Catholic Christians are mostly concentrated in the northern part of the region, notably in the municipalities with a Hungarian ethnic majority and in the multiethnic city of Subotica and multiethnic municipality of Bečej. The population of Subotica, the second largest city in Vojvodina, is 63.02% Catholic.

The Catholic population which lived in the region during the time of the Medieval Kingdom of Hungary mostly fled from the region following the Ottoman conquest in the 16th century, and was replaced by Orthodox and Muslim inhabitants. A new Catholic population started to settle in the region with the establishment of Habsburg rule at the end of the 17th century. The 18th century colonizations were base for the current religious composition of Vojvodina, where there is a Catholic majority in several of the northern municipalities.

Protestant Christianity

Protestant Christians makeup 3.3% of the population of Vojvodina. Most of the ethnic Slovaks are adherents of Protestant Christianity. Some members of other ethnic groups (especially Serbs in absolute terms and Hungarians and Germans in proportional terms) are also adherents of various forms of Protestant Christianity.

The largest percentage of Protestant Christians in Vojvodina on municipal level is in the municipalities of Bački Petrovac and Kovačica, where the absolute or relative majority of the population are ethnic Slovaks.

According to the 2011 census, the largest Protestant communities were recorded in the municipalities of Kovačica (11,349) and Bački Petrovac (8,516), as well as in Stara Pazova (4,940) and the Vojvodinian capital Novi Sad (8,499), which are predominately Orthodox. While Protestants from Kovačica, Bački Petrovac and Stara Pazova are mostly Slovaks, members of Slovak Evangelical Church of the Augsburg Confession in Serbia, services in most of the Protestant churches in Novi Sad are performed in the Serbian language.

Protestantism (mostly in its Nazarene form) started to spread among Serbs in Vojvodina in the last decades of the 19th century. Although, percentage of Protestants among Serbs is not large, it is the only religious form besides Orthodoxy, which is today widely spread among Serbs.

Islam

The ethnic groups whose members are mostly adherents of Islam are: ethnic Muslims, Albanians, Gorani, Bosniaks, Ashkali, and Egyptians. A smaller number of ethnic Romani are also adherents of Islam.

During Ottoman rule (16th-18th centuries), the Muslim population of the region was quite large and was mostly concentrated in the cities. Many cities of the region thus had a majority Muslim population, such as Sremska Mitrovica, which according to the 1566/69 data had a population composed of 592 Muslim and 30 Christian houses. According to the 1573 data, this city had  17 mosques and no Christian church. Following the establishment of the Habsburg rule at the end of the 17th and the beginning of the 18th century, the Muslim population fled from the region. The current Muslim inhabitants of the region are mostly 20th century settlers from the Muslim areas of the former Yugoslavia.

Judaism
As elsewhere in the world, the Judaism is primarily associated with ethnic Jews. In the village of Čelarevo archaeologists have also found traces of people who practiced a Torah religion. Bunardžić dated Avar-Bulgar graves excavated in Čelarevo, containing skulls with Mongolian features and Judaic symbols, to the late 8th and 9th centuries. Erdely and Vilkhnovich consider the graves to belong to the Kabars who eventually broke ties with the Khazar Empire between the 830s and 862.

Today numbering only 329 people in Vojvodina, the Jewish population of the region numbered about 19,000 before the World War II. As elsewhere in Axis-occupied Europe, those Jews who did not flee were mostly killed or deported in the war.

See also
Vojvodina
Ethnic groups of Vojvodina
Religion in Serbia
Religious architecture in Novi Sad

References

Gallery